Péter Vincze; (born 16 February 1995 in Székesfehérvár) is a Hungarian professional ice hockey Forward who currently plays for Újpesti TE in the Erste Liga.

References

External links

1995 births
Fehérvár AV19 players
DVTK Jegesmedvék players
Living people
Hungarian ice hockey forwards
Sportspeople from Székesfehérvár
20th-century Hungarian people
21st-century Hungarian people